Exoprimal is an upcoming third-person shooter game developed and published by Capcom. It is a multiplayer action game in which the player must fight against massive hordes of dinosaurs and mutated prehistoric creatures. The game is scheduled for release on July 14, 2023, for the PlayStation 4, PlayStation 5, Windows, Xbox One and Xbox Series X/S.

Gameplay

Exoprimal is a player-versus-player-versus environment video game. In the game, the player assumes control of an Exofighter, who must complete a series of combat challenges set by a sinister artificial intelligence named Leviathan in order to uncover a way to destroy it. The game features multiple exosuit armor, with each having its own weapons and abilities. For instance, Roadblock is a tank character who is equipped with a shield, the Witchdoctor is a support character who can heal other players, while Barrage is an explosive expert. Players can change their classes during gameplay, or apply "rigs" to their characters, which grant them abilities from other classes. Players can also progress through the game's Survival Pass to unlock new skins and cosmetic items for their exosuits and weapons.

The main mode in the game is "Dino Survival". Two teams of five players must race against each other to complete the objectives set by Leviathan. The main opponents in the game are dinosaurs unleashed from mysterious vortexes, including T-rex, Triceratops and massive hordes of raptors, as well as mutated prehistoric creatures named "NeoSaurs" which have special combat abiltiies. The objectives and combat challenges players must complete include Dinosaur Cull, VTOL Defense, Data Key Security, Omega Charge, and Energy Taker. According to game director Takuro Hiraoka, players are sometimes required to fight against or fight with each other. Dinosaur Cull requires players to eliminate a specific kind of dinosaur, while VTOL Defense tasks players to guard a grounded aircraft and protect it from dinosaur attacks. As the player completes objectives, they will gain experience points, which would allow them to further upgrade their characters and unlock more story missions.

Development
Exoprimal is currently being developed by Capcom. The team's goal was to design an action game that was distinct from Capcom's previous titles, and they envisioned a game in which players are required to overcome and eliminate horde of enemies, unlike Monster Hunter in which players only take on one single enemy at a time. Dinosaurs were chosen as the game's main enemy type because Hiraoka and the team believed that "it would be fun to experience the threat of history's most fearsome predators", especially if they attack players in a massive horde. The game is not related to the Dino Crisis series, though the producer of that series, Hiroyuki Kobayashi, was involved in the development and production of Exoprimal.

The game was officially announced during Sony's State of Play livestream in March 2022. Capcom arranged network tests for PC players in July and August 2022, allowing them to play a pre-release version of the game. An open beta for the game was held from 17 to 19 March 2023. Exoprimal is set to be released for the PlayStation 4, PlayStation 5, Windows, Xbox One, and Xbox Series X/S as a "fully-priced" product in 2023.

References

External links
 

Upcoming video games scheduled for 2023
Capcom games
Windows games
PlayStation 4 games
PlayStation 5 games
Xbox One games
Xbox Series X and Series S games
Video games developed in Japan
Video games set on fictional islands
Dinosaurs in video games
Video games set in the future
Video games with customizable avatars
Third-person shooters
Action video games
Multiplayer video games